C.W. Downer & Co. was a Boston-based global Investment Bank specializing in comprehensive middle-market M&A advisory services. The firm assists both strategic and private equity clients with acquisition, divestiture, and capital raising assignments.

C.W. Downer & Co. was founded in Boston, Massachusetts, in 1975 and has additional offices in Dublin, Frankfurt, Madrid, Mumbai, Oslo, Paris, Shanghai and Sydney. The firm is named for company founder Charles W. Downer and operated as Downer & Company until a rebranding effort was completed in 2008.

In 2016 C.W. Downer & Co. merged with the Spanish firm N+1 Group. The combined company is now called Alantra.

History
Charles W. Downer founded C.W. Downer & Co. in 1975 to provide cross-border merger and acquisition advisory services with a primary focus on middle-market company ($20–500 million) transactions. In 1980, the firm opened its first international office in Paris. It later established offices in Sydney, Dublin, Frankfurt, Shanghai, Madrid, Oslo and Mumbai.

In April 2008 the firm changed its name from Downer & Company to C.W. Downer & Co. The firm trademarked its tagline, “Because the middle-market is global,” with the United States Patent and Trademark Office.

Charles W. Downer was awarded the Association for Corporate Growth's 2010 Lifetime Achievement Award.

On April 27, 2016, C.W. Downer & Co. completed its previously announced merger with N+1, a global investment bank and asset management firm headquartered in Madrid, Spain. In addition to M&A advisory, N+1 offers debt advisory, restructuring, and equity and debt capital market services. The combined entity employed 240 investment banking professionals across 14 offices in 13 countries. The company was renamed N+1 Downer.

On September 26, 2016, N+1 Downer became Alantra. With this decision, the partners of the 19 countries and different businesses did away with brands that existed from 15 to 40 years, including N+1, Downer, Swiss Capital, Daruma, and Dinamia. Alantra's 57 partners and 345 professionals operate from 25 global offices.

References

External links
 Company Website

Former investment banks of the United States
American companies established in 1975
Financial services companies established in 1975
Banks established in 1975
Financial services companies disestablished in 2016
Banks disestablished in 2016
2016 mergers and acquisitions
Companies based in Boston
1975 establishments in Massachusetts
2016 disestablishments in Massachusetts
American companies disestablished in 2016